Barbora Kodetová (born 6 September 1970) is a Czech actress perhaps best known for her portrayal of Paul Atreides' concubine Chani in the 2000 television miniseries Frank Herbert's Dune and its 2003 sequel, Frank Herbert's Children of Dune.

She is the daughter of Czech actor Jiří Kodet, granddaughter of Czech actress Jiřina Steimarová and comes from a large family of actors. She is the cousin of actress Anna Polívková.
Barbora is married to violinist Pavel Šporcl. She has three daughters - Lily Marie (born 15 February 2001), Violeta (born 26 July 2007) and Sophia (born 24 August 2009).

Filmography 
Fantaghirò 2 (1992) TV series .... Catherine
Učitel tance (1995) .... Lydie
Rivers of Babylon (1998) .... Lenka
Der Starkare (1999) .... Nora
"Případy detektivní kanceláře Ostrozrak" (2000) TV series .... Julie
Dune (2000) .... Chani
Children of Dune (2003) .... Chani
The Prince & Me (2004) .... English Teacher's Assistant
Redakce (2004) .... editor-in-chief Alice Poláková (2004–2005)
Tristan & Isolde (2006) .... Lady Marke
Peklo s princeznou (2009) .... Nanny Bětuše
A Son's War (2010) .... Františka Wiener

External links

1970 births
Living people
21st-century Czech actresses
Czech film actresses
Czech television actresses
Actresses from Prague
Prague Conservatory alumni